Mustapha Tchaker Stadium, is a multi-purpose stadium in Blida, Algeria.  It is currently used mostly for football matches.  The stadium has a capacity of 25,000 people. The stadium is the home of the Algeria national football team.

International matches

Algeria statistics at Mustapha Tchaker

USM Blida statistics at Mustapha Tchaker

References

External links

 Stade Mustapha Tchaker profile - worldstadiums.com

Football venues in Algeria
Multi-purpose stadiums in Algeria
Blida
Buildings and structures in Blida Province
USM Blida